Karim Tulaganov (Карим Тулаганов; born August 27, 1973) is an Uzbek boxer. At the 1996 Summer Olympics he won a bronze medal in the men's Light Middleweight category, together with Yermakhan Ibraimov of Kazakhstan.

Amateur career
Tulaganov Olympic results were:
Defeated Oscar Gómez (Argentina) RSC 3 (2:50)
Defeated Yared Wolde (Ethiopia) 13-9
Defeated Rival Cadeau (Seychelles) RSC 1 (1:24)
Lost to David Reid (United States) 4-12

Pro career
Tulaganov turned pro in 2001 and had limited success.  He compiled a career record of 1-3-0 and retired in 2002.

External links
 

1973 births
Living people
Olympic boxers of Uzbekistan
Boxers at the 1996 Summer Olympics
Olympic bronze medalists for Uzbekistan
Olympic medalists in boxing
Medalists at the 1996 Summer Olympics
Uzbekistani male boxers
Light-middleweight boxers